The Winston School is a private coeducational day school in Dallas, Texas. The grade K-12 school is for children who must learn using non-traditional techniques. Established in 1975, the school is named after Sir Winston Churchill and offers individualized curricula for students with learning differences.

See also

Dell-Winston School Solar Car Challenge

References

External links
The Winston School

Educational institutions established in 1975
Independent Schools Association of the Southwest
Private schools in Dallas
1975 establishments in Texas